State of the Re:Union was a nationally aired public radio show created and hosted by playwright and performance artist Al Letson.  State of the Re:Union was distributed by the Public Radio Exchange and National Public Radio, airing five seasons and 56 episodes on its networks from 2010 to 2015. The show won the Peabody Award in 2014.

Origins 
State of the Re:Union was a concept created by Al Letson as an entry in the Public Radio Talent Quest, which started with more than 1,400 hopefuls. The contest aimed to identify a new generation of Public Radio on-air talent. After four rounds and voting from both a select panel of judges and the public at large, three winners were selected. For his pilot episode, Letson and team created "Welcome to D.C." Two of the three winning shows were awarded with a year's worth of funding to produce new episodes, including State of the Re:Union.

Format 
The stated mission of State of the Re:Union is to "show listeners how we are more alike than we are different and the many ways our differences are celebrated. The additional underlying premise is to show "how a particular city, town or area creates a community." Each hour-long episode centers on a particular area and typically poses a question with which to explore the area. For example, the Jacksonville episode asks the question, "Is Jacksonville the Bold New City of the South?" as it is advertised. Typically, the show centers on three to four segments that feature stories that try to answer the proposed question. Letson narrates the program and conducts most of the interviews, but stories are also heard from first-person narratives. The main segments are accompanied by listener-written and read letters to the city, music, lighter fare and Letson's spoken word pieces.

Chosen topics are typically selected from current events, cultural happenings and out-of-the-ordinary business ventures. Due to such a wide range of features, the tone ranges from serious, investigatory and at times somber to happy, hopeful and humorous.

Part of the show is the "Dear City Letters" section, where people who are making a difference are asked if they'd be willing and able to write a letter TO their city.

Episodes

Pilot season
Four episodes were grouped as Pilot Season.

Season 1
Season 1 is composed of 12 total episodes including a Black History Month special "Who is this man?", five Spring 2010 season episodes, and six Fall 2010 season episodes and specials.

Season 2
Season 2 is composed of 10 episodes including the Spring 2011 season and Fall 2011 season.

Season 3
Season 3 is composed of 13 episodes including the Fall 2012 season and the Spring 2013 season.

Season 4
Season 4 includes the Fall 2013 season and the Spring 2014 season. It also includes some Black History Month specials.

Season 4 shorts

Season 5
Season 5 includes the Fall 2014 season and the 2015 season.

Season 5 shorts

Accolades 
 Friedheim Travel Award: for the public radio broadcast of “Brooklyn - Change Happens”
 National Lesbian & Gay Journalists Association Award for Excellence in Radio for the episode “Bayard Rustin: Who is This Man?”, 2011
 Peabody Award for State of the Re:Union, 2014
 Edward R. Murrow Award for the "As Black As We Wish to Be" episode, 2013
 Edward R. Murrow Award for "The Hospital Always Wins" episode, 2014
 Edward R. Murrow Award for the "Trans Families" episode, 2015
 Radio Television Digital News Association (RTDNA) Kaleidoscope Award for the “Trans Families” episode, 2015

References

External links 
 
 PRX's State of the Re:Union Page

NPR programs
American documentary radio programs
2010 radio programme debuts 
2015 radio programme endings